"Kiss This" is a song co-written and recorded by American country music artist Aaron Tippin.  It was released in May 2000 as the first single from his album People Like Us. The song, written by Tippin with his wife, Thea, and Phillip Douglas, became his third and final Number One on the Billboard country charts, five years after his last Number One, "That's as Close as I'll Get to Loving You" in 1995, as well as the first Number One for the Lyric Street Records label, the label that Tippin was signed to at the time.

Content
The song's protagonist is a woman who found out her former lover has been cheating on her, and getting revenge on him. It is in a 4/4 time signature and the key of B major, with an approximate tempo of 116 beats per minute. Tippin's vocal ranges two octaves, from F3 to F5. It features backing vocals from Melodie Crittenden, Kim Parent, and Joanna Janét. Tippin's wife, Thea, with whom he wrote the song, can be heard saying "See ya!" at the end.

Music video
The music video was directed by Trey Fanjoy, and premiered on CMT on May 26, 2000, where CMT named it a "Hot Shot".

Chart performance
The song debuted at number 70 on the Hot Country Singles & Tracks chart dated May 27, 2000. It charted for 33 weeks on that chart, and reached number-one on the chart dated October 14, 2000, remaining at the top for two weeks, and becoming Tippin's third and final number-one single. It also peaked at number 42 on the Billboard Hot 100.

Year-end charts

References

2000 singles
2000 songs
Aaron Tippin songs
Music videos directed by Trey Fanjoy
Lyric Street Records singles
Songs written by Aaron Tippin
Songs about revenge
Songs about infidelity